The 1951 East Rift Valley earthquakes were a series of earthquakes which struck eastern Taiwan from 22 October 1951 to 5 December 1951, four of which registered at 7 or greater on the moment magnitude scale, the largest of those being magnitude 7.3 and 7.8 quakes on November 24. Altogether the quakes killed 85 people.

Technical data
The East Rift Valley is an area of rugged terrain formed by the interaction of the Philippine Sea and Eurasian tectonic plates in eastern Taiwan. Most of the area is sparsely populated by Taiwanese aborigines, but there are larger populations in the cities of Hualien and Taitung. The deadliest earthquake in the series struck at 05:34 on 22 October 1951, with an epicentre at 23.9°N 121.7°E, a few kilometres southwest of Hualien City, with a magnitude of 7.3, and was felt throughout Taiwan as well as on Penghu and Kinmen (Quemoy). The second quake to cause significant casualties hit at 02:50 on November 25 of the same year, again with a magnitude of 7.3, this time centred under the town of Yuli, Hualien.

Earthquakes

Names
The earthquake series is sometimes known by different names, including the 1951 Hualien earthquakes and the 1951 Hualien-Taitung earthquakes – both of these refer to the same series of quakes in eastern Taiwan from October to December 1951.

Damage
The total figures for casualties and damage from Taiwan's Central Weather Bureau are as follows:
85 deaths
200 seriously injured
1,000 lightly injured
Around 3,000 dwellings completely destroyed

See also
 Chihshang fault
 List of earthquakes in 1951
 List of earthquakes in Taiwan

References

External links
Photographs of the damage caused

Earthquakes in Taiwan
East Rift Valley Earthquakes, 1951 
East Rift Valley Earthquakes, 1951 
East Rift Valley
Earthquake clusters, swarms, and sequences
Hualien City
Hualien County
Taitung County
Tsunamis in Taiwan